Mark Colin Carter (born 17 December 1960 in Liverpool, England) is an English former footballer.

Mark Carter, more commonly known to all as Spike, was a lethal goal scorer. He plied his trade almost exclusively in the non league of English & Welsh Football until he was signed by Barry Fry for Barnet. Fry was preparing his club for a final push for Football League status and promotion from the GM Football Conference. Duly promoted Carter was able to pit his scoring skills against professional defences and managed just short of 100 goals at Barnet then Bury and finally Rochdale.

Also a fine cricketer he played for Bootle Cricket Club in the Liverpool and District Cricket Competition

Carter is the leading scorer of the England semi-pro team, with 13 goals in 11 appearances.

Notes

1960 births
Living people
English footballers
Association football forwards
South Liverpool F.C. players
Bangor City F.C. players
Runcorn F.C. Halton players
Barnet F.C. players
Bury F.C. players
Rochdale A.F.C. players
Ashton United F.C. players
Glossop North End A.F.C. players
England semi-pro international footballers
English Football League players
National League (English football) players
Footballers from Liverpool